The New Katraj Tunnel is a highway tunnel located on the NH 48 (formerly NH 4), Pune, in Maharashtra state of India. It is a three-laned tunnel which stretches up to 1,223 metres on Katraj Ghat. This tunnel replaced the Old Katraj Tunnel. The Tunnel was constructed using NATM (New Austrian Tunnelling Method).

It was opened on 15 December 2006 by Chief Minister Mr. Vilasrao Deshmukh. The tunnel is part of the Golden Quadrilateral Project.

Transport in Pune
Road tunnels in India
Road tunnels in Maharashtra
Tunnels completed in 2006
Buildings and structures in Maharashtra
2006 establishments in Maharashtra